Neshar (also Romanized as  Nashar; also known as Nishār and Noh Shahreh) is a village in Gonbad Rural District, in the Central District of Hamadan County, Hamadan Province, Iran. At the 2006 census, its population was 445, in 107 families.

References 

Populated places in Hamadan County